The 1973 Oceania Cup Final was a football match that took place on 24 February 1973 to determine the winners of the 1973 Oceania Cup. It was the final of the first Oceania Cup, a tournament contested by the senior men's national teams of the member associations of OFC to decide the champions of Oceania.

New Zealand won their inaugural Oceania Cup, beating Tahiti 2–0. New Zealand's Dave Taylor opened the scoring before Alan Marley scored their second to clinch the title.

Match

Details

References

OFC Nations Cup Finals
New Zealand national football team matches
Tahiti national football team matches
 
February 1973 sports events in New Zealand